Édouard Luntz (8 August 1931 – 26 February 2009) was a French film director. He directed nine films between 1959 and 1973. His 1966 film Les coeurs verts was entered into the 16th Berlin International Film Festival and his 1970 film Le dernier saut was entered into the 1970 Cannes Film Festival.

Filmography
 ...Enfants des courants d'air (1959)
 Le silence (1960)
 Insolites et clandestins (1961)
 Bon pour le service (1963)
 L'escalier (1964)
 Les coeurs verts (1966)
 Le dernier saut (1970)
 L'humeur vagabonde (1972)
 Le grabuge (1973)

References

External links

1931 births
2009 deaths
French film directors
French male screenwriters
20th-century French screenwriters
20th-century French male writers